Decoy receptor 2 (DCR2), also known as TRAIL receptor 4 (TRAILR4) and tumor necrosis factor receptor superfamily member 10D (TNFRSF10D), is a human cell surface receptor of the TNF-receptor superfamily.

Function
The protein encoded by this gene is a member of the TNF-receptor superfamily. This receptor contains an extracellular TRAIL-binding domain, a transmembrane domain, and a truncated cytoplasmic death domain. 

This receptor does not induce apoptosis, and has been shown to play an inhibitory role in TRAIL-induced cell apoptosis.

References

Further reading

Clusters of differentiation
TNF receptor family